Alexisonfire is the debut studio album from Canadian post-hardcore band Alexisonfire, released on October 31, 2002.

Release
Alexisonfire was released on October 31, 2002. The cover art was photographed by lead singer George Pettit at Ferndale Public School in St. Catharines, Ontario. It is based on the lyrics from "A Dagger Through the Heart of St. Angeles". There was also an alternative cover art released, which just depicts the band's logo and name. In June 2003, the band embarked on short tour of Canada with From Autumn to Ashes, A Static Lullaby, and Boys Night Out. The following month, the band performed at Hellfest. In September and October, the band went on a tour of Canada with Billy Talent, Spitalfield and Death from Above. Following this, the band played with Spitalfield on their tour of the US. In December 2003, the band went on an eastern Canadian tour, with Jersey and At the Mercy of Inspiration.

On January 14, 2014, a remixed and remastered version of the album by Dine Alone Records was released.

Reception

In 2015, NME listed the album as one of "20 Emo Albums That Have Resolutely Stood The Test Of Time". In 2022, Andrew Sacher of BrooklynVegan wrote that the album defined typical emo characteristics such as "Two singers, one who screams and one who whine-sings... Chaotic song structures... Bright melodies even at the most aggressive moments... Verbose teenage poetry, sometimes delivered as tense spoken word... [and an] overwhelming amount of melodrama..." Sacher said that the album "helped establish [the foregoing traits] as dominant traits of the early 2000s emo/post-hardcore boom."

In August 2009, the album was given platinum certification as it sold over 100,000 units in Canada.

Track listing

Personnel

 George Pettit – unclean vocals, photography
 Wade MacNeil – guitars, backing vocals
 Chris Steele – bass guitar
 Dallas Green – clean vocals, guitars
 Jesse Ingelevics – drums

 Greg Below – producer, engineer, mixer
 D. Sandshaw – A&R for Equal Vision Records
 George Kotsopoulos – drum editor
 Bed Kaplan – drum editor
 Bill Scoville – album layout

Release history

Videos
"Pulmonary Archery"
"Counterparts and Number Them"
"Waterwings (And Other Poolside Fashion Faux Pas)"

External links
 Alexisonfire official site
 Distort Entertainment 
 Equal Vision Records
 Sore Point Records

References

Alexisonfire albums
2002 debut albums
Equal Vision Records albums
Defiance Records albums